2-Ethoxyethyl acetate is an organic compound with the formula CH3CH2OCH2CH2O2CCH3.  It is the ester of ethoxyethanol and acetic acid.  A colorless liquid, it is partially soluble in water.

Properties 
2-Ethoxyethyl acetate is a liquid at room temperature that is used as a solvent. It can be absorbed through inhalation, ingestion, and dermally and should be avoided. It may form an explosive mixture with air. It is also incompatible with strong acids, strong alkalis and nitrates. It may form unstable peroxides and it can soften many plastics, attack plastics, rubber and coatings.

Uses 
2-Ethoxyethyl acetate has been used to dissolve polyester and short oil alkyd resins. It has also been used in coatings, dyes, insecticides, soaps and cosmetics. It is also a solvent for nitro-cellulose and is being used for the same applications as ethyl glycol

In automobile lacquers it has been used to reduce evaporation and to impart a high gloss.

Metabolism 
2-Ethoxyethyl acetate is rapidly metabolized to 2-ethoxyethanol in the blood via hydrolysis. Then, 2-ethoxyethanol is metabolized, mainly by alcohol dehydrogenase, to 2-ethoxyacetaldehyde, which is further metabolized by aldehyde dehydrogenase to 2-ethoxyacetic acid (2-EAA) in the liver. These two compounds are the likely active metabolites, which are thought to be involved in some of the toxic effects. Also in the liver, ethylene glycol is produced. All this reactions belong to the phase I of the biotransformation process. In rats, EAA can be conjugated with glycine or may suffer O-deethylated. After this, it can be metabolized to carbon dioxide. An extra pathway in these animals involves microsomal P450 mixed function oxidases, with deethylation producing acetaldehyde and ethylene glycol.

Safety 
2-Ethoxyethyl acetate can cause a slight skin and eye irritation after exposure. High exposure can lead to kidney damage and paralysis.  In animals, reproductive and teratogenic effects have been observed.

References 

Glycol ethers
Acetate esters
Solvents
Glycol esters